Jan Aalmis or Johannes Aelmis  (bapt. 4 April 1674, Rotterdam – bur. 2 April 1755, Rotterdam) was a noted painter on faience.  He long worked for Cornelis de Berg of Delft. Pieces bearing his name, together with the mark of Cornelis de Berg, are dated 1731, and consist of figure subjects, often in blue, but occasionally in polychrome. He was the father of the painter, draftsman, and tile painter Jan Aelmis (II) (1714 – 1799) and the painter and draftsman Johan Bartolomeus Aelmis (1723 – 1786). The signed pieces can therefore also be those of his elder son.

References

1674 births
1755 deaths
Dutch ceramists
Artists from Rotterdam